Panatoor  is a village in  the Chittoor district of Andhra Pradesh in India.

Location and accessibility 
Panatoor is located on the Chittoor-Vellore road which is an intersection road from Bangalore-Chennai NH4 Highway, Village is located 2 km from the Tamil Nadu border.

Administration
Panatoor comes under Gudipala Mandal and chittoor district.  The official Language is Telugu.

References 

Mandal: Gudipala

http://rwss.ap.nic.in/pred/reports/assetReports/rws_asset_hab_rpt.jsp?district=10&mandal=55&panchayath=25
http://www.distancesfrom.com/in/distance-from-Bengaluru-to-Panatoor-Bomma-Samudram/DistanceHistory/18011330.aspx

Villages in Chittoor district